Swakoppoort Dam is a dam  outside of Okahandja, Otjozondjupa Region, Namibia. It dams the Swakop River  and occasionally receives inflow from the Omatako Dam on Swakop's tributary Omatako. Completed in 1978, it is one of three dams to supply water to the capital Windhoek. It also supplies the Navachab mine and the town of Karibib.

References

Okahandja
Dams in Namibia
Dams completed in 1978
1978 establishments in South West Africa
Buildings and structures in Otjozondjupa Region
Windhoek